Zambian Traditional Ceremonies.

1. Central Province

2. Copperbelt Province

3. Eastern Province

4. Luapula Province

5. Lusaka Province

6. Northern Province

 
7. Muchinga Province

8. North Western Province

9. Southern Province

10. Western Province

References

Society of Zambia